The Chorley and District Building Society is a UK building society based in Chorley, Lancashire, England. It is a member of the Building Societies Association.

The society has three branches located on Foxhole Road and High Street, Chorley and Towngate, Leyland.

History
Chorley and District Building Society is the oldest building Society in Lancashire. It became established on 7 March 1859 and was originally called The Chorley Permanent Benefit Building Society. It was created to help mill workers buy their homes. In those early days the Society only met once a month, when the subscriptions were collected. The Society became incorporated under the Building Society's Act on 6 August 1874. The original name was then changed to The Chorley (£60 Shares) Permanent Benefit Building Society on 17 February 1897.

References

External links
 Chorley and District Building Society
 Building Societies Association

Building societies of England
Banks established in 1859
Organizations established in 1859
Companies based in Chorley
Organisations based in Lancashire
1859 establishments in England